Stadhuis RandstadRail station refers to two homonymous stations in the RandstadRail network:
 Stadhuis metro station (Rotterdam), operated by RET and served by metro line E.
 Stadhuis RandstadRail station (Zoetermeer), operated by HTM and served by lines 3, 4 and 34.

See also 
 City Hall Station (disambiguation)